Myrrha is a genus of ladybirds originally defined by French entomologist Étienne Mulsant in his 1846 monograph of the ladybird family Coccinellidae. One species Myrrha octodecimguttata, is found in Europe.

References 

Coccinellidae genera
Taxa named by Étienne Mulsant